10 Ways to Steal Home Plate is the second studio album by American DJ and producer Wolfgang Gartner that was released on January 29, 2016.

Track listing

Charts

References

External links 

2016 albums
Wolfgang Gartner albums